Going, Going, Gone is a British game show that aired on BBC2 from 16 October 1995 to 10 March 1998. It was originally hosted by Andy Craig for the first two series and then hosted by Stuart Hall for the third series.

Format
The programme's format was simple: three celebrities described an antique and gave it a valuation. One is telling the truth and the other two are lying. The two contestants had to guess which description was true, and were awarded points if they guessed correctly. A film of the real auction would be shown with the item described being bid for.

In the final round, both players 'bid' for an item by trying to guess the value that the antique went for with the person finishing with the nearest price winning the bonus points. The winner would take home an antique as a prize and the loser took home a 'booby prize' of a flying duck, the show's motif, mounted on a plaque. In fact, every contestant really wanted the flying duck.

Transmissions

References

External links

1995 British television series debuts
1998 British television series endings
1990s British game shows
Antiques television series
BBC television game shows
English-language television shows
Television series by Banijay